Control Freaks is the debut album by the British R&B/pop girl group Sirens. The album featured the singles "Things Are Gettin' Better" and "Baby (Off The Wall)", their highest-charting song to date.

Track listing

References

2004 debut albums
Sirens (British band) albums
Kitchenware Records albums